Dimah Mil Olya (also Romanized as Dīmah Mīl ‘Olyā; also known as Dīmeh-ye Mīl-e Bālā) is a village in Bakesh-e Do Rural District, in the Central District of Mamasani County, Fars Province, Iran. At the 2006 census, its population was 84, in 20 families.

References 

Populated places in Mamasani County